Actias angulocaudata is a moth in the family Saturniidae described by Stefan Naumann and Thierry Bouyer in 1998. It is found in China and Laos.

References

Angulocaudata
Moths described in 1998
Moths of Asia